John Bromley (c. 1682 – 20 October 1718), of Horseheath Hall, Cambridgeshire, was an English owner of land in England and Barbados, and a Tory politician who sat in the House of Commons from 1707 to 1718.

Bromley was born in Barbados, the son of John Bromley and his wife Dorothy White, daughter of Thomas White of Fittleford, Dorset. His father was a prosperous sugar planter of unknown origins who settled back in England. He was admitted at Clare College, Cambridge in 1700. He married Mercy Bromley, daughter of William Bromley on 10 August 1704. For the year 1704 to 1705, he served as High Sheriff of Cambridgeshire and Huntingdonshire. In 1707 he inherited estates in Cambridgeshire and Barbados from his father.

Bromley was returned unopposed as Member of Parliament (MP) for Cambridgeshire in succession to his father at a by-election on 4 December 1707. He was returned unopposed in 1708 and voted consistently with the Tories. He was to some extent beholden to the local Whigs and after he voted against the impeachment of Dr Sacheverell in 1710, he faced a contest at the  1710 British general election, but nevertheless  topped the poll. In Parliament, he showed himself as a staunch Tory, and was one of the ‘worthy patriots’ who  exposed the mismanagements of the previous ministry. He was also a member of the October Club. At the 1713 general election he was returned unopposed. He was elected in a contest again in 1715 and sat until his death.
 
Bromley died at Horseheath Hall, aged 36, on 20 October 1718 and was buried at Horseheath parish church. He and his wife had one son, Henry, who became the 1st Baron Montfort. In his will he specified that the Horseheath estate should be completed in accordance with his plans.

References

1682 births
1718 deaths
People from Horseheath
Alumni of Clare College, Cambridge
British MPs 1707–1708
British MPs 1708–1710
British MPs 1710–1713
British MPs 1713–1715
British MPs 1715–1722
Members of the Parliament of Great Britain for English constituencies
High Sheriffs of Cambridgeshire and Huntingdonshire